The 2013 Miami Hurricanes football team  represented the University of Miami during the 2013 NCAA Division I FBS football season. It was the Hurricanes' 88th season of football and 10th as a member of the Atlantic Coast Conference. The Hurricanes were led by third-year head coach Al Golden and played their home games at Sun Life Stadium. They finished the season 9–4 overall and 5–3 in the ACC to finish in a three-way tie for second place in the Coastal Division. They were invited to the Russell Athletic Bowl where they lost to Louisville 36–9.

Personnel

Coaching staff

Support staff

Roster

Recruiting

Position key

Recruits

Schedule

Rankings

2014 NFL Draft

References

Miami
Miami Hurricanes football seasons
Miami Hurricanes football